The 108th Division was created in February 1950 under the Regulation of the Redesignations of All Organizations and Units of the Army, issued by Central Military Commission on November 1, 1948, basing on the 310th Division and 2 regiments from 3rd Independent Security Brigade, 111th Corps of Republic of China Army defected on September 19, 1949 during the Chinese Civil War.

The division was part of 36th Corps.

In April 1951 the division became a cadre division.

In February 1952 the division was disbanded.

References

中国人民解放军各步兵师沿革, http://blog.sina.com.cn/s/blog_a3f74a990101cp1q.html

Infantry divisions of the People's Liberation Army
Military units and formations established in 1950
Military units and formations disestablished in 1952